Isaiah "Mike" Caldwell, Jr. (born August 31, 1971) is an American football coach who is the defensive coordinator for the Jacksonville Jaguars of the National Football League (NFL). He previously served as the inside linebackers coach for the Tampa Bay Buccaneers from 2019 to 2021.

Caldwell played college football as a linebacker at Middle Tennessee State University and was drafted in the third round by the Cleveland Browns in the 1993 NFL Draft. Caldwell played 11 seasons in the NFL with the Browns, Baltimore Ravens, Arizona Cardinals, Philadelphia Eagles, Chicago Bears and Carolina Panthers.

Caldwell began his professional coaching career with the Philadelphia Eagles in 2008. He previously served as the linebackers coach for the Arizona Cardinals, and was the assistant head coach and inside linebackers coach for the New York Jets from 2015 to 2018. He served as the linebackers coach for the Tampa Bay Buccaneers from 2019 to 2021 before being hired as the defensive coordinator for the Jacksonville Jaguars.

Playing career

College
Mike Caldwell finished his career with 52 games played and 7 forced fumbles. In 1992, he led the team with 76 tackles (47 solo, 29 assists). He was also a 3rd team All-American that year and 1st team Ohio Valley Conference selection.

National Football League
Caldwell made an immediate impact for the Cleveland Browns as a rookie under Bill Belichick and Nick Saban. He would finish with 42, 40, and 70 tackles from 1993 to 1995 with 3 interceptions. After 1 year with the Baltimore Ravens (54 Tackles, 4.5 Sacks, 1 INT) he signed with the Arizona Cardinals in 1997 and had 29 tackles with 2 Sacks and 1 INT.

From 1998 to 2001 he played with the Philadelphia Eagles accumulating 221 tackles with 5 Sacks and 3 INT. In 2002, he went to the Chicago Bears where he had 61 tackles and 3 Sacks before closing out his career with the Carolina Panthers, appearing in just 9 games.

Coaching career

Philadelphia Eagles
Caldwell was hired by the Philadelphia Eagles as the defensive quality control coach in 2008. He was promoted to assistant linebackers coach on February 3, 2010. He was promoted to linebackers coach on February 7, 2011.

New York Jets
Caldwell was hired as assistant head coach and inside linebackers coach by the New York Jets on January 23, 2015.

Tampa Bay Buccaneers
In 2019, Caldwell rejoined the staff of former Arizona Cardinals head coach Bruce Arians alongside former defensive coordinator Todd Bowles. Caldwell earned his first Super Bowl title when the Buccaneers won Super Bowl LV.

Jacksonville Jaguars
On February 17, 2022, Caldwell was hired by the Jacksonville Jaguars as their defensive coordinator under head coach Doug Pederson.

Personal life
His niece, Nikki Caldwell, was head coach of women's basketball at LSU.

References

External links
 Philadelphia Eagles profile

1971 births
Living people
African-American coaches of American football
African-American players of American football
American football linebackers
Arizona Cardinals coaches
Arizona Cardinals players
Baltimore Ravens players
Carolina Panthers players
Chicago Bears players
Cleveland Browns players
Jacksonville Jaguars coaches
Middle Tennessee Blue Raiders football players
National Football League defensive coordinators
New York Jets coaches
People from Oak Ridge, Tennessee
Philadelphia Eagles coaches
Philadelphia Eagles players
Tampa Bay Buccaneers coaches
21st-century African-American sportspeople
20th-century African-American sportspeople